The Elabana Falls is a cascade waterfall that is located within Lamington National Park in the South East region of Queensland, Australia.

Location and features
Access to the falls is via walking tracks from Green Mountains (O'Reilly's), including the Box Forest circuit and the Toolona Creek circuit.

See also

 List of waterfalls of Queensland

References

External links

South East Queensland
Cascade waterfalls
Waterfalls in Lamington National Park